George Warren Grebenstein (September 19, 1884 – May 21, 1980) was an All-American basketball player at Dartmouth College as a junior in 1905–06. A forward, he was the first Dartmouth player to be named an All-American while leading the Big Green to a 16–2 record.  The Helms Athletic Foundation retroactively named Dartmouth the national champion that season since it occurred prior to the NCAA tournament. He graduated from Dartmouth in 1907. Grebenstein went on to coach the Harvard men's basketball team in 1907–08 and 1908–09. He compiled a record of 5–19.

Grebenstein later worked for the federal government, for the United States Department of Commerce in Boston and later for the United States Census Bureau until his retirement in 1965. He died on May 21, 1980, at his home in Upton, Massachusetts.

Head coaching record

References

External links
 

1884 births
1980 deaths
All-American college men's basketball players
American men's basketball coaches
American men's basketball players
Basketball coaches from Massachusetts
Basketball players from Massachusetts
College men's basketball head coaches in the United States
Dartmouth Big Green baseball players
Dartmouth Big Green men's basketball players
Harvard Crimson men's basketball coaches
Power forwards (basketball)
Small forwards
United States Census Bureau people
United States Department of Commerce officials